Mehmet Çakır (born 4 January 1984 in Bala, Ankara) is a Turkish professional footballer. He currently plays as an attacking midfielder for Tuzlaspor.

Biography 
In September 2011 he was sold to Kardemir Karabükspor for Turkish lira 400,000.

References

External links
 

1984 births
Living people
Turkish footballers
Süper Lig players
Gençlerbirliği S.K. footballers
Ankaraspor footballers
MKE Ankaragücü footballers
Trabzonspor footballers
Kardemir Karabükspor footballers
Elazığspor footballers
Turkey under-21 international footballers
Association football midfielders